The 1965–66 Turkish Cup was the 4th edition of the annual tournament that determined the association football Süper Lig Turkish Cup champion under the auspices of the Turkish Football Federation (TFF). Galatasaray successfully contested Beşiktaş 1–0 in the final. The results of the tournament also determined which clubs would be promoted or relegated.

Quarter-finals
In the Quarter Finals round, Fenerbahçe, Galatasaray, Gençlerbirliği, and Beşiktaş advanced to the Semi-Finals round;  Denizli Karagücü, Ankaragücü, Adana Demirspor, and Bursaspor were eliminated.

|}

Semi-finals
In the Semi-Finals round, Galatasaray and Beşiktaş advanced to the final; Fenerbahçe and Gençlerbirliği were eliminated.

|}

Final
Galatasaray successfully contested Beşiktaş 1–0, their 4th Turkish Cup.

|}

References

External links
Turkish Soccer

1965–66
Cup
Turkey